Chekhov Library in Taganrog (full name The Central Municipal Public Library named after Anton Chekhov) is the oldest library in the South of Russia.

Foundation history

The public library along with a small bookstore were officially inaugurated on 23 May 1876 by the Governor of Taganrog Admiral Johan Hampus Furuhjelm. The City Council gave to the library some of its vacant offices on Grecheskaya Street. Before, there were only private libraries and libraries at the Boys Gymnasium, Mariinskaya Girls Gymnasium and the Taganrog Naval School.
In March 1878, the Public Library moved into another building granted by the City Council on Petrovskaya Street.

School years of Anton Chekhov

Among the first subscribers were the future world-famous writer Anton Chekhov, historian Pavel Filevsky, Vladimir Bogoraz, artists Seraphima Blonskaya and Dmitri Sinodi-Popov. Andrei Drossi, the classmate of Chekhov wrote later in his memoirs: "..every Sunday and every holiday we came early in the morning in the city library and spent there hours and hours, forgetting about food, sitting and reading magazines...". At that time, Anton Chekhov lived in Taganrog alone, as the whole family had moved to Moscow. According to archive records, the first books read by Chekhov were books on travel and adventures, then Miguel de Cervantes, Harriet Beecher Stowe, Ivan Turgenev and Ivan Goncharov, later - Dimitri Pisarev, Vissarion Belinsky and Nikolay Aleksandrovich Dobrolyubov.

Thanks to the library of his home city, Chekhov being a gymnasium student learnt about the periodicals that later published his short stories.

Books from Chekhov the writer
In 1890, mayor of Taganrog Konstantin Foti asked Chekhov to send his books with author's dedications to the Taganrog Public Library. Anton Chekhov considered this request as recognition from the home city, and replied I am happy to be helpful to my homecity, to which I owe a lot and that I love very much. The first three books were collections of his stories and a book by Leo Tolstoy with the author's dedication. Chekhov kept the tradition of sending his books, rare books, books with autographs and foreign books with every opportunity from 1890 up until his death in Badenweiler in 1904.

The Chekhov Library and Museum
In 1904, following Chekhov's death, the library was named after the world-famous playwright and short-story writer. A room of the library was also dedicated for the first Chekhov Museum in Russia. In 1906–1907, the City Council discussed the construction of a new building that would house both Chekhov Library and Chekhov Museum. After thorough analysis, the council decided to build a library, paying tribute to the late author Anton Chekhov, assigning for this purpose 25,000 rubles. The commission addressed the friend of Chekhov, architect Fyodor Schechtel in March 1910. He gave his agreement along with the library project in July 1910. The small house built in 1878 was demolished and the new library was officially laid down on 14 September 1910. It was completed in August 1911 and opened its doors in 1912. The music department of the library is located at the historical Tchaikovsky House in Taganrog.

Gallery

References 
 Filevskii, Pavel (1898) Istoriya goroda Taganroga. Moskva: Tipo-lit. K. F. Aleksandrova
 Encyclopedia of Taganrog, second edition, Taganrog, 2003.
 The official Chekhov Public Library web site.

External links
 Official homepage

Libraries in Russia
Museums in Taganrog
Library buildings completed in 1911
Anton Chekhov
Literary museums in Russia
1911 establishments in the Russian Empire
Cultural heritage monuments of regional significance in Rostov Oblast